Liechtenstein competed at the 1976 Summer Olympics in Montreal, Quebec, Canada.

Results by event

Athletics
Men's 800 metres
 Günther Hasler
 Heat — 1:48.83 (→ did not advance)

Women's Competition
 Helen Ritter
 Maria Ritter

Judo
Men's Competition
 Paul Büchel
 Fritz Kaiser
 Hans-Jakob Schädler

References
Official Olympic Reports

Nations at the 1976 Summer Olympics
1976
1976 in Liechtenstein